Ben Farrell (July 17, 1946 – August 10, 2022) was an American concert promoter who was best known for promoting Garth Brooks.

Early life 
Farrell was born in Jackson, Tennessee. His father was American professional baseball player, coach, and manager Kerby Farrell. After attending Lipscomb University, the younger Farrell was drafted by the Philadelphia Phillies and played for the farm clubs of the Houston Astros and the Chicago White Sox. The US Army drafted Farrell in 1968, and he served two years.

Music career 
Farrell worked with Lon Varnell of Varnell Enterprises from 1970. He assisted with concert promotions, marketing, and supervision of events for acts such as Elvis and Elton John. Farrell started working with Garth Brooks in 1989.

Farrell was nominated for Promoter of the Year several times by the Academy of Country Music Awards; and was inducted into the International Entertainment Buyers Association's Hall of Fame in 2016 after having booked or promoted more than 5,000 concerts.

Death
Farrell died August 10, 2022.

References 

1946 births
2022 deaths
Businesspeople from Tennessee
American entertainment industry businesspeople
American music industry executives
Music promoters
Lipscomb University alumni
People from Jackson, Tennessee